Thalassotalea agarivorans  is an agarolytic bacterium from the genus of Thalassotalea which has been isolated from coastel water from An-Ping Harbour on Taiwan.

References

 

Alteromonadales
Bacteria described in 2014